The Cheetah Girls: Passport to Stardom is a video game based on the movie The Cheetah Girls: One World. It was released for the Nintendo DS on August 19, 2008 in North America and on December 8 in PAL regions. It is the sequel to the 2007 video game The Cheetah Girls: Pop Star Sensations.

Plot
The game takes place after the events of The Cheetah Girls: One World. The Cheetah Girls explore and perform their way through India before participating in various international competitions in Spain and New York City.

Gameplay
In the game, the player plays various mini-games as Aqua, Chanel and Dorinda in order to progress. These mini-games include a rhythm game (where the player must correctly time the notes in a song by either by pressing "B", tapping the screen, or singing into the DS's microphone), a memory game (where the player must memorize the stitching on a piece of clothing and replicate the positioning), and a tile-matching video game. The player can also customize the girls' clothing using in-game currency.

The game featured DGamer integration, which allowed for cooperative play and sharing of custom outfits with friends.

Songs
There are a total of 12 songs in the game. All are from the 3 Cheetah Girls movies, four of which are from The Cheetah Girls: One World. 10 of these songs are sung by cover artists and 2 are sung by The Cheetah Girls. The songs can be heard even if the DS is closed.

References

External links 
 Official game page

2008 video games
Music video games
Nintendo DS games
Nintendo DS-only games
Video game sequels
Video games developed in the United States
Video games set in India
Video games set in Spain
Video games set in New York City
Disney video games
Video games based on films
Video games
Video games featuring female protagonists
Video game franchises introduced in 2006
Multiplayer and single-player video games